Chile competed at the 1956 Winter Olympics in Cortina d'Ampezzo, Italy.  The nation sent four alpine skiers to the Games.

Alpine skiing

Hernan Oelckers is also listed as a member of the Chilean ski team, but did not compete.

References

Nations at the 1956 Winter Olympics
1956
1956 in Chilean sport